Eliot Andrew Marshall (born July 7, 1980) is a retired American mixed martial artist. He was a cast member on SpikeTV's The Ultimate Fighter: Team Nogueira vs. Team Mir.

Background
Marshall grew up in the Franklinville section of Franklin Township, Gloucester County, New Jersey and attended Delsea Regional High School. Influenced by Karate Kid, Marshall started practising Soo Bahk Do at the age of six, eventually placing second in the national championships and being promoted to 3rd degree black belt in the sport. Marshall started training jiu-jitsu in 1999 after moving to Colorado to attend the University of Colorado from where he graduated with a degree in mathematics.

Mixed martial arts career

The Ultimate Fighter
Eliot appeared on season 8 of The Ultimate Fighter. To be a castmember for the rest of the season he had to win his bout against Karn Grigoryan in the elimination round. Eliot lost the fight via a controversial split decision that shocked all spectators leaving many to believe that the judges thought Marshall was Grigoryan. Before Eliot left it was announced that a few fighters would be unable to continue onto the show, with Karn being one of them. Needing a replacement, Eliot was given a second chance.

He had his second fight in the house against Shane Primm, he defeated Primm by rear naked choke early in the first round. After the match, Eliot called out future opponent and TUF winner Ryan Bader.

Eliot got his match against Bader, but lost the fight by unanimous decision.

Ultimate Fighting Championship
Eliot defeated Jules Bruchez, his former castmate on The Ultimate Fighter, at the TUF 8 Finale.

His next fight was against Vinicius Magalhães at UFC 97, whom he defeated by unanimous decision.

He fought Jason Brilz on September 19, 2009 at UFC 103 in a closely contested bout, winning by controversial split decision.

Marshall then faced former IFL Light Heavyweight Champion Vladimir Matyushenko on March 21, 2010 at UFC LIVE: Vera vs. Jones. Marshall lost a split decision (30-27, 28–29, 30–27).

Following his loss to Matyushenko, Marshall was released from the promotion along with UFC veteran Shannon Gugerty.

Post UFC
Despite his cut from the UFC, he was featured in the countdown show for UFC 111: St-Pierre vs Hardy from the camp of then-Interim Heavyweight Championship challenger Shane Carwin.

Eliot Marshall was expected to face Chris McNally at the Nemesis Fighting: MMA Global Invasion at the Hard rock in Punta Cana, Dominican Republic, but event was postponed to avoid a storm. The fight was rescheduled for December 10, 2010.

Return to the UFC
Marshall faced Luiz Cané on March 19, 2011 at UFC 128, replacing an injured Karlos Vemola.  He lost the fight via TKO in the first round.

Marshall fought Brandon Vera on October 29, 2011 at UFC 137, losing a unanimous decision.

After the loss to Vera, Marshall was released by the UFC and later announced his retirement from MMA competition.

Personal life
Eliot and his wife Renee have two sons, Kannen and Simon. After retiring from professional competition, Eliot took over the head coach position of Team Elevation with notable students like two-time UFC Bantamweight champion TJ Dillashaw, Curtis Blaydes, Alistair Overeem, Neil Magny, Cory Sandhagen among others.

Mixed martial arts record 

|-
| Loss
|align=center| 10–4
| Brandon Vera
| Decision (unanimous)
| UFC 137
| 
|align=center| 3
|align=center| 5:00
|Las Vegas, Nevada, United States
|
|-
| Loss
|align=center| 10–3
| Luiz Cané
| TKO (punches)
| UFC 128
| 
|align=center| 1
|align=center| 2:15
|Newark, New Jersey, United States
| 
|-
| Win
|align=center| 10–2
| Chris McNally
| Submission (armbar)
| Nemesis Fighting: MMA Global Invasion
| 
|align=center| 1
|align=center| N/A
|Punta Cana, Dominican Republic
| 
|-
| Win
|align=center| 9–2
| Adriano Camolese
| Decision (unanimous)
| BTT MMA 1: Someone's Going Down
| 
|align=center| 3
|align=center| 5:00
|Denver, Colorado, United States
| 
|-
| Win
|align=center| 8–2
| Josh Haynes
| Decision (unanimous)
| ROF 39: Summer Brawl 2
| 
|align=center| 3
|align=center| 5:00
|Denver, Colorado, United States
| 
|-
| Loss
|align=center| 7–2
| Vladimir Matyushenko
| Decision (split)
| UFC Live: Vera vs. Jones
| 
|align=center| 3
|align=center| 5:00
|Broomfield, Colorado, United States
| 
|-
| Win
|align=center| 7–1
| Jason Brilz
| Decision (split)
| UFC 103
| 
|align=center| 3
|align=center| 5:00
|Dallas, Texas, United States
| 
|-
| Win
|align=center| 6–1
| Vinny Magalhães
| Decision (unanimous)
| UFC 97
| 
|align=center| 3
|align=center| 5:00
|Montreal, Quebec, Canada
| 
|-
| Win
|align=center| 5–1
| Jules Bruchez
| Submission (rear-naked choke)
| The Ultimate Fighter: Team Nogueira vs Team Mir Finale
| 
|align=center| 1
|align=center| 1:27
|Las Vegas, Nevada, United States
| 
|-
| Loss
|align=center| 4–1
| Rob MacDonald
| TKO (punches)
| ROF 31: Undisputed
| 
|align=center| 2
|align=center| 1:41
|Broomfield, Colorado, United States
| 
|-
| Win
|align=center| 4–0
| Marcus Sursa
| Submission (rear-naked choke)
| ROF 29: Aftershock
| 
|align=center| 2
|align=center| 4:59
|Broomfield, Colorado, United States
| 
|-
| Win
|align=center| 3–0
| Damir Mihajlovic
| TKO (punches)
| ROF 28: Evolution
| 
|align=center| 1
|align=center| 3:57
|Broomfield, Colorado, United States
| 
|-
| Win
|align=center| 2–0
| Dan Green
| Submission (rear-naked choke)
| ROF 27: Collision Course
| 
|align=center| 1
|align=center| 0:46
|Denver, Colorado, United States
| 
|-
| Win
|align=center| 1–0
| Mike Altman
| Submission (keylock)
| ROF 24: Integrity
| 
|align=center| 1
|align=center| 2:02
|Castle Rock, Colorado, United States
|

References

External links

UFC Profile

1980 births
Living people
Sportspeople from Boulder, Colorado
People from Franklin Township, Gloucester County, New Jersey
American male mixed martial artists
Mixed martial artists from New Jersey
Light heavyweight mixed martial artists
Mixed martial artists utilizing Brazilian jiu-jitsu
American practitioners of Brazilian jiu-jitsu
People awarded a black belt in Brazilian jiu-jitsu
Ultimate Fighting Championship male fighters